Markus Wildauer (born 25 May 1998) is an Austrian cyclist, who currently rides for UCI Continental team . He was selected to compete in the road race at the 2020 UCI Road World Championships.

Major results
2016
 1st  Time trial, National Junior Road Championships
 4th Overall Trofeo Karlsberg
2018
 1st  Time trial, National Under-23 Road Championships
 1st Stage 2 Giro Ciclistico d'Italia
 3rd  Time trial, UEC European Under-23 Road Championships
 4th Overall Gemenc Grand Prix
1st Young rider classification
2019
 2nd Time trial, National Under-23 Road Championships
 4th Gran Premio Industrie del Marmo
 9th Time trial, UCI Under-23 Road World Championships
2021
 10th Gran Premio di Lugano

References

External links

1998 births
Living people
Austrian male cyclists
People from Schwaz District
Sportspeople from Tyrol (state)
21st-century Austrian people